Gunnellichthys is a genus of wormfishes native to the Indian Ocean to the central Pacific Ocean.

Species
There are currently seven recognized species in this genus:
 Gunnellichthys copleyi (J. L. B. Smith, 1951)
 Gunnellichthys curiosus C. E. Dawson, 1968 (Curious wormfish)
 Gunnellichthys grandoculis (Kendall & Goldsborough, 1911)
 Gunnellichthys irideus J. L. B. Smith, 1958
 Gunnellichthys monostigma J. L. B. Smith, 1958 (Onespot wormfish)
 Gunnellichthys pleurotaenia Bleeker, 1858 (Onestripe wormfish)
 Gunnellichthys viridescens C. E. Dawson, 1968 (Yellowstripe wormfish)

References

Microdesmidae
Gobiidae
Marine fish genera
Taxa named by Pieter Bleeker